Adriano Buzzati-Traverso (6 April 1913, Milan, Italy – 22 April 1983) was an Italian geneticist. In 1962 he founded in Naples the Laboratorio Internazionale di Genetica e Biofisica (International Laboratory of Genetics and Biophysics).

The name of the fly Drosophila buzzatii, often used in genetical and evolutionary studies, derives from this significant Italian scientist.

He was the brother of the well-known writer Dino Buzzati.

References

Dino Buzzati
1913 births
1983 deaths
Italian geneticists